Belgium competed at the 1992 Winter Paralympics in Tignes/Albertville, France. 3 competitors from Belgium won no medals and so did not place in the medal table.

See also 
 Belgium at the Paralympics
 Belgium at the 1992 Winter Olympics

References 

1992
1992 in Belgian sport
Nations at the 1992 Winter Paralympics